Chaj Doab can be classified as one of the main regions of Punjab, Pakistan. Punjab historically has been divided into regions based on its various rivers, since the name Punjab is based on its five main rivers. The Chaj doab includes the area between the Jhelum and Chenab rivers. It lies on the southern fringes of the Kashmir valley.

Districts 

This doab covers Gujrat District, Bhimber District, Mirpur District, Mandi Bahauddin District, Sargodha District, Lalian Tehsil of Chiniot District and some areas of Jhang Tehsil of Jhang District.

See also
 Indus Sagar Doab
 Rachna Doab
 Bari Doab

References

Doabs of Punjab, Pakistan
Geography of Punjab, Pakistan
Punjab
Punjab, Pakistan
Regions of Punjab, Pakistan